The 914. Grenadier-Regiment was a regiment of the Wehrmacht in the Second World War. It formed part of the 352. Infanterie-Division, and fought in the Battle of Normandy.

References

Regiments of the German Army in World War II
Grenadier regiments